Funemployed is the name of both a book by Australian author, performer and musician Justin Heazlewood and an album by his alter-ego The Bedroom Philosopher. It was serialised on ABC Radio National, and also made available as a podcast

Summary
Described by its author as 'Part confessional and part rogue self-help book'
, Funemployed details financial, psychological and logistical challenges facing creative individuals in Australia. Drawing on Heazlewood's own experiences, the book features interviews with Tony Martin, Gotye, John Safran, Clare Bowditch, Amanda Palmer and many others.

Funemployed was launched with a complete live reading at Melbourne venue The Howler.

Album

Heazlewood released an eight-track soundtrack album Funemployed LP to accompany the book. It was initially released under his own name but later changed to The Bedroom Philosopher. It features spoken word pieces from interview subjects Brian Ritchie, Tim Rogers and Sam Simmons. This followed the Funemployed EP which remained released under his own name and was distributed via a download code with the initial run of books.

References

External links
The Bedroom Philosopher official site
The Bedroom Philosopher's Bandcamp page.
Wikiquote has a collection of quotations related to: Justin Heazlewood q:Justin Heazlewood

2014 non-fiction books
2014 albums
Australian non-fiction books